Coryphocera elegans is a species of beetles in the family Scarabaeidae. It is found in Senegal.

References 

 Observations critiques sur la famille des lamellicornes mélitophiles. Annales de la Société Entomologique de France, HR Schaum, 1844, page 352

External links 

Dynastinae